The 2020 UNAF U-20 Tournament was the 13th edition of the UNAF U-20 Tournament. The tournament took place in Tunisia, from 13 to 28 December 2020.
This tournament serves as a qualification event for the Africa U-20 Cup of Nations. The champions and the runners-up will qualify for the 2021 Africa U-20 Cup of Nations.

Participants
Egypt withdrew from the tournament due to seventeen players from the team testing positive for SARS-2 coronavirus.

Venues

Squads

Match officials
A total of 9 referees and 10 assistant referees were appointed for the tournament.

Referees
 Lotfi Bekouassa (Algeria)
 Lamia Atman (Algeria)
 Ahmed El-Ghandour (Egypt)
 Yara Atef (Egypt)
 Mutaz Ibrahim Al-Shalmani (Libya)
 Jalal Jayed (Morocco)
 Bouchra Karboubi (Morocco)
 Mehrez Melki (Tunisia)
 Dorsaf Ganouati (Tunisia)

Assistant Referees
 Abbes Akram Zerhouni (Algeria)
 Redouane Bounoua (Algeria)
 Ahmed Tawfiq Taleb (Egypt)
 Yousef El-Bosati (Egypt)
 Bassim Saef El-Naser (Libya)
 Majdi Kamel (Libya)
 Hicham Aït Abbou (Morocco)
 Hamza Naciri (Morocco)
 Fatiha Jermouni (Morocco)
 Mohamed Bakir (Tunisia)
 Faouzi Jridi (Tunisia)

Tournament
<onlyinclude>

Matches
All times are local, CET (UTC+1).

Champions

Qualified teams for Africa U-20 Cup of Nations
The following four teams from CAF qualify for the 2021 Africa U-20 Cup of Nations.

1 Bold indicates champion for that year. Italic indicates host for that year.

Statistics

Goalscorers

Awards
 Golden ball: 
 Golden boot: 
 Golden glove: 
 Fair play trophy:

References

External links
تونس تستضيف دورة منتخبات تحت 20 عاما - UNAF official website

2020 in African football
UNAF U-20 Tournament
UNAF U-20 Tournament